The 2014 Southern Conference men's basketball tournament took place between Friday, March 7 and Monday, March 10 in Asheville, North Carolina, at the U.S. Cellular Center. The entire tournament was streamed on ESPN3, with the Southern Conference Championship Game televised by ESPN2. The champion received an automatic bid into the 2014 NCAA tournament.

It was the last Southern Conference tournament for four teams that will officially leave the conference on July 1, 2014. Appalachian State and Georgia Southern, which are upgrading their football programs to the top-level Division I FBS, will join the FBS Sun Belt Conference. Davidson will become a member of the Atlantic 10 Conference. Elon will join the Colonial Athletic Association.

Despite all of these departures, the championship game was contested between two teams who will remain in the Southern Conference.  Western Carolina reached the championship by coming back from double-digit deficits, including a 15-point second-half deficit to regular season champion Davidson in the semifinals.  In the championship game, it looked like history might repeat itself, as the Catamounts came back from an 11-point deficit to as close as 1.  However, Trey Sumler missed a last-second three-point shot to tie the game, and Wofford won their 3rd conference championship.

Seeds

Bracket

All-tournament team
First Team
De'Mon Brooks, Davidson
Brandon Boggs, Western Carolina
James Sinclair, Western Carolina
Karl Cochran, Wofford
Lee Skinner, Wofford

Second Team
Ashton Moore, The Citadel
Z. Mason, Chattanooga
Tawaski King, Western Carolina
Trey Sumler, Western Carolina
Eric Garcia, Wofford

References

External links
 SoCon Basketball Championship

Tournament
Southern Conference men's basketball tournament
Southern Conference men's basketball tournament
Southern Conference men's basketball tournament
Basketball competitions in Asheville, North Carolina
College sports tournaments in North Carolina
College basketball in North Carolina